The Revolutionary Ukrainian Party was a Ukrainian political party in the Russian Empire founded on 11 February 1900 by the Kharkiv student secret society Hromada.

History
The rise of the party came about with a successful consummation after other attempts from various public associations, such as the Brotherhood of Tarasovs and the Social-Democratic Circle of Ivan Steshenko and Lesya Ukrainka, were tried. Originally, the aim of R.U.P. was the independence of all Ukrainian national elements. What made the R.U.P. unique was the willingness to embrace all political philosophies, including socialism.

The party officially arose at its First Congress in December 1902 when six party communities united into one political party in the following cities: Kharkiv, Poltava, Kyiv, Nizhyn, Lubny, and Yekaterinodar, as well as some smaller groups representing such cities as Romny, Pryluky, Odessa, Moscow and Saint Petersburg. The congress, also, elected the party Central Committee, Foreign Committee and Publication Committee, with the last two located abroad in Lemberg and Czernowitz. The Central Committee consisted of Dmytro Antonovych, Yevhen Holitsynsky (later replaced by Volodymyr Vynnychenko), Mykhailo Tkachenko, and V. Kozynenko, while the Foreign Committee was headed by Antonovych and Vynnychenko.

In 1903, the party turned away from its original nationalistic program of an Independent Ukraine and changed to a program that was more based on the principals and goals of international social democracy such as the Erfurt Program. That same year RUP was joined by the Kyiv-based Ukrainian Socialist Party that mirrored the party programme of the Polish Socialist Party that was created by Kyivan Polish students and Polish Ukrainophiles. Also, in 1903, many members of RUP were arrested, while others fled to Lemberg (Lviv). Marian Melenevsky became the head of the Foreign Committee.

In 1904, Mykola Porsh ascended to be a new party leader. The party shifted its focus away from peasantry, instead concentrating on the Ukrainian urban proletariat. In August, a representative of RUP, Yevhen Holitsynsky, participated at the International Socialist Congress in Amsterdam; however, due to a protest by the RSDLP members on a separate Ukrainian delegation, he was forced to join their delegation at the event.

In December 1904, the Second Congress of the RUP took place which culminated in a split with Marian Melenevsky, leading the more Marxist members to establishing the Ukrainian Social Democratic Union (Spilka) in January 1905 that later became an autonomous entity of the RSDLP and was instrumental during the Revolution of 1905 in Ukraine.

In December 1905, the RUP was renamed the Ukrainian Social Democratic Labour Party (USDLP).

References

External links

 Revolutionary Ukrainian Party at the Encyclopedia of Ukraine

1900 establishments in Ukraine
1905 disestablishments in the Russian Empire
Defunct nationalist parties
Defunct socialist parties in Ukraine
Left-wing nationalist parties
Nationalist parties in Ukraine
Political parties disestablished in 1905
Political parties established in 1900
Ukrainian political parties in Imperial Russia